Austrocorduliidae is a family of dragonflies occurring in South Africa and Australia, 
which until recently was considered to be part of the Corduliidae family.
Members of Austrocorduliidae are small to medium-sized, dark dragonflies with clear wings.

Genera
The family includes the following genera:

 Apocordulia 
 Austrocordulia 
 Austrophya 
 Hesperocordulia 
 Lathrocordulia 
 Micromidia

Notes
The family Austrocorduliidae is not currently recognised in the World Odonata List at the Slater Museum of Natural History.

References

 
Odonata families
Odonata of Australia